Vedic metre refers to the poetic metre in the Vedic literature. The study of Vedic metre, along with post-Vedic metre, is part of Chandas, one of the six Vedanga disciplines.

Overview

In addition to these seven, there are fourteen less frequent ones syllable-based metres (Varna-vritta or Akshara-chandas):
- 8. Atijagati (13x4); 9. Śakkarī (14x4); 10. Atiśakarī  (15x4); 11. Ashṭi (16x4);
- 12. Atyashti (17x4); 13. Dhritī  (18x4); 14. Atidhritī (19x4); 15. Kṛiti (20x4);
- 16. Prakṛiti (21x4); 17. Ākṛiti (22x4): 18. Vikṛiti (23x4); 19.   Śankṛiti  (24x4);
- 20. Atikṛiti (25x4); 21. Utkṛiti (26x4).
(Note: all metres have several varieties (from 2 to 30 depending on the case).
There is also the metre  called Dandaka  which is the general name given to other metres of this class exceeding the measure (26x4) of Utkriti (Dandaka is the No. 22 on the list compiled by H.H. Wilson).

Furthemore, there are several other minor metres found in the Vedas, of which the following are two examples: 
: 4 lines of 10 syllables).
 : 3 lines of 8, 12, 8 syllables).

Gāyatrī metre
The shortest and most sacred of Vedic metres is the Gāyatrī metre. A verse consists of three octosyllabic sections (pāda). The following is an example of the opening of a Rigvedic hymn in Gāyatrī metre:

The Gāyatrī metre is considered as the most refined and sacred of the Vedic metres, and one that continues to be part of modern Hindu culture as part of Yoga and hymns of meditation at sunrise.

The general scheme of the Gāyatrī is a stanza of three 8-syllable lines. The length of the syllables is variable, but the rhythm tends to be iambic (ᴗ – ᴗ –), especially in the cadence (last four syllables) of each line. However, there is one rare variety, used for example in Rigveda 8.2.1–39, in which the cadence is trochaic (– ᴗ – x). Another cadence sometimes found (especially in the first line of a stanza) is (ᴗ ᴗ ᴗ x). 
The last syllable of a line may be long or short indifferently.

The Gāyatrī metre makes up about 25% of the entire Rigveda. The only metre more commonly used in Rigveda than Gāyatrī is the Tristubh metre. The structure of Gāyatrī and other Vedic metres is more flexible than post-Vedic metres.

One of the best known verses of Gāyatrī is the Gayatri Mantra, which is taken from book 3.62.10 (the last hymn of the 3rd book) of the Rigveda.

When the Rig-Veda is chanted, performers traditionally recite the first two padas of Gāyatrī without making a break between them, in accordance with the generally used saṃhitā text. However, according to Macdonell, "there is no reason to believe that in the original text the second verse was more sharply divided from the third than from the first." When the Gayatri Mantra is recited, on the other hand, a pause is customarily made after each pada.

When there is a pause, a short syllable at the end of a line can be considered long, by the principle of brevis in longo.

Although the Gāyatrī is very common in the Rigveda, it fell out of use early and is not found in Sanskrit poetry of the classical period. There is a similar 3 x 8 stanzaic metre in the Avestan scriptures of ancient Iran.

See also
Vedic accent
Sanskrit prosody
Gayatri Mantra

References

Bibliography
 (Also here)
Gunkel, Dieter and Kevin M. Ryan. (2018) "Phonological Evidence for Pāda Cohesion in Rigvedic Versification". In Language and Meter, ed. Dieter Gunkel and Olav Hackstein, 34–52. Leiden: Brill.
Macdonell, A. A. (1916) A Vedic Grammar for Students. Appendix II. Vedic Metre (pp. 436–447).
Müller, F. Max, Vedic Hymns, Part I (Sacred Books of the East, Vol. 32)
Mylius, Klaus (1983) Geschichte der altindischen Literatur, Wiesbaden.
Tr. V. G. Paranjpe and M. A. Mehendale,  Motilal Banarsidass 2005 
 .
van Nooten, B. und G. Holland, Rig Veda, a metrically restored text,  Department of Sanskrit and Indian Studies, Harvard University, Harvard University Press, Cambridge, Massachusetts and London, England, 1994.

External links
 The Hymns Of The Rigveda V1, Volume 1 List of metres.
 Appendix II of Griffith's translation, a listing of the names of various Vedic metres, with notes.
 A.A. Macdonell on Vedic metre. (Contains only metrical appendix).
 Rigveda chanted. The hymn to Indra is at 12:28.
 Transliterated text of Rigveda book 1.
 Gayatri Mantra sung

Vedangas
Sanskrit
Prosodies by language
Indian poetics